There are two biblical figures named 'Beeri.' The etymology of Beeri (Bə’êrî) is given as "belonging to a fountain" by Wilhelm Gesenius, but as "expounder" by the International Standard Bible Encyclopedia and "well" according to the Holman Bible Dictionary.

According to the Book of Hosea, Beeri  was the father of the prophet Hosea. Jewish tradition says that he only uttered a few words of prophecy, and as they were insufficient to be embodied in a book by themselves, they were incorporated in the Book of Isaiah, viz., verses 19 and 20 of the 8th chapter. As such, Beeri is considered a prophet in Judaism. Beeri was sometimes identified with Beerah (1 Chronicles 5:6), who was taken into exile by the Assyrians. He is also considered holy by Muslims.

The other Beeri was the father of Judith, one of the wives of Esau (Genesis 26:34).  A source of grief to her parents-in-law.

References

Prophets in Judaism
Book of Hosea